Gaja is one of the significant animals finding references in Hindu scriptures and Buddhist and Jain texts.

Gaja may also refer to:
Gaja (name)
Gaja (surname)
Gaja (wine), a Piemonte wine producer
Gaja (film), an Indian film from Karnataka
 The gaja, a piece in the board game chaturanga

See also
 Gaja-et-Villedieu, commune in the Aude department in southern France
 Gaja-la-Selve, commune in the Aude department in southern France